The Knob is a summit located in Central New York Region of New York located in the Town of Kirkland, in Clinton.

References

Mountains of Oneida County, New York
Mountains of New York (state)